Amour Abdenour (Tamaziɣt: ⵄⴻⵎⵎⵓⵕ ⵄⴻⴱⴷⴻⵏⵏⵓⵕ, Arabic: عمور عبد النور), born February 17, 1952, in Leflaye, near Bejaia, Algeria, is an Algerian Kabyle singer, songwriter and composer.

Life and career
As a young boy, Abdenour was interested in music; he listened to songs on the radio and learned to play the flute, goblet drum (darbouka) and finally the guitar at age of 11.

In 1964, while living with his grandparents, he joined the JFLN, a local cultural association which gave him the opportunity to enrich his talent by attending and participating in local events. In 1968, He moved to Algiers. A year later he wrote and composed his first song, named Yeǧǧa-tt ("Left Alone"), which first aired on the radio in 1970. Busy with his studies and military duty, that he had waited until the end of the 70s to release his first song, starting a long, ongoing career.

Discography
(For detailed discography with the track list of each of the following albums, refer to the French Wikipedia article) 
1972 : Aεetteb ("Work Hard")
1974 : Lebḥer ("Ocean")
1978 : D lεid ("Celebration")
1985 : Tifirellas
1987 : Mmi-s n tmurt-iw ("The son of my country")
1988 : Ruḥ ur d-ttuɣal ("Go Away, Don't Come Back")
1989 : Tamdint ("City")
1991 : A leflani ("Someone")
1992 : Tirza ("Visit") 
1993 : Σnu-tt ("Deal With Her") 
1994 : Argu ay ul-iw ("Keep on Dreaming") 
1995 : A lbaz err-itt-id ("Eagle, Bring her Back") 
1996 : Ili-k d lkayes  
1997 : Wiss zzman ("If Times") 
1998 : Amek akka ("Why is That ?") 
1999 : Nna Crifa ("Aunt Cherifa") 
2000 : Yelli-s n tmurt ("Country Girl") 
2001 : Tikwal ("Sometimes") 
2002 : Ugin azaglu 
2003 : Ah ya dini ("I'll Be Damned") 
2004 : Attan attan ("There She Is") 
2005 : Ma nniɣ-am ("If I Told You")
2006 : Uɣal-ed ("Come Back")
2007 : Tḥermeḍ ("You Forbid")
2008 : Ḥader iman-ik ("Be Careful") 
2009 : Ay imesdurar ("People of The Mountain")
2010 : Iger n ttar ("Revenge")
2016 : Err-itt-id ("Get Her Back")
2017 : Taɣuri ("Reading")
(xx : denotes unknown year of release)

External links and sources 
 [Fr] Amour Abdenour, Zenith 100% kabyle en coulisse
 [Fr] Artist's page on a Kabyle music site
 [Fr] Amour Abdenour revient sur scène
 [Fr] Le chanteur Amour Abdenour invité du plateau "Parole aux artistes"

References

Kabyle people
1952 births
Living people
20th-century Algerian  male singers
21st-century Algerian  male  singers
People from Béjaïa Province